ABS-CBN (an initialism of its two predecessors' names, Alto Broadcasting System and Chronicle Broadcasting Network) is a Philippine commercial broadcast network that serves as the flagship property of ABS-CBN Corporation, a company under the Lopez Group owned by the López family. The media conglomerate of the same name, however, is the largest entertainment and media conglomerate in the Philippines.

1946–1972: Beginnings

The company was founded on June 13, 1946, as Bolinao Electronics Corporation (BEC). BEC was established by James Lindenberg, one of the founding fathers of Philippine television, an American electronics engineer who went into radio equipment assembly and radio broadcasting. At that time, the largest media company was Manila Broadcasting Company (MBC), with DZRH as the leading radio station. In 1949, James Lindenberg shifted Bolinao to radio broadcasting with DZBC and masterminded the introduction of television to the country in 1953.

In 1951, Lindenberg partnered with Antonio Quirino, brother of then-Philippine President Elpidio Quirino, in order to try their hand at television broadcasting. In 1952, BEC was renamed as Alto Broadcasting System or ABS (with Alto Sales Corporation as its corporate name). "Alto" was a contraction of Quirino's and his wife's first names, Tony and Aleli. Though they had little money and resources, ABS was able to put up its TV tower by July 1953 and import some 300 television sets. The initial test broadcasts began in September of the same year. The very first full-blown broadcast was on October 23, 1953, of a party in Tony Quirino's humble abode. The television station was known as DZAQ-TV. The first program to air was a garden party at the Quirino residence in Sitio Alto, San Juan. After the premiere telecast, the station followed a four-hour-a-day schedule, from six to ten in the evening.

On June 16, 1955, Republic Act No. 1343 signed by President Ramon Magsaysay granted the Manila Chronicle its broadcasting franchise, leading to the formation of the Chronicle Broadcasting Network.

The Chronicle Broadcasting Network (CBN) was founded on September 24, 1956, by Eugenio Lopez Sr. and the then-Philippine Vice President Fernando Lopez. The network initially focused only on radio broadcasting. It launched its very own TV station, DZXL-TV 9, on April 19 (or July), 1958. On February 24, 1957, Don Eugenio acquired ABS from Quirino and Lindenberg. A month later, Don Eugenio also acquired Monserrat Broadcasting System.

In 1958, the network's new headquarters at Dewey Boulevard were inaugurated, and all radio and television operations were consolidated into its two buildings – the radio stations at the Chronicle Building at Aduana Street, Intramuros, Manila and the TV operations at the brand new Dewey Boulevard building in Pasay, Rizal.

The ABS-CBN brand was first used in 1961. However, it was only on February 1, 1967, that the corporate name was changed to ABS-CBN Broadcasting Corporation. Before it was named ABS-CBN Broadcasting Corporation, the corporate name was Bolinao Electronics Corporation (BEC).

In the late 1950s, Don Eugenio's son Geny saw the potential of TV and radio to reach and link Filipinos across the archipelago. By the mid-1960s, the ABS-CBN network was leading the radio industry, with stations like DZXL and DZAQ Radyo Patrol in the Manila area, which featured journalists like Ernie Baron, Bong Lapira, Orly Mercado, Joe Taruc, Mario Garcia, Jun Ricafrente, Bobby Guanzon, and Rey Langit, and various other stations nationwide. ABS-CBN also made breakthroughs in the TV industry by achieving the country's first color TV broadcast, first satellite feed broadcasts (during remarkable events including the Apollo 11 moon landing, the collapse of Ruby Tower in Manila during the 1968 Casiguran earthquake, assassination and funeral of Robert F. Kennedy and the 1968 United States presidential election), and first use of videotape, among others. It featured top shows then, such as Your Evening with Pilita and Tawag ng Tanghalan, the country's first comedy show Buhay Artista, first Philippine game show, What's My Living and the first noontime show Student Canteen, among others. It was also pioneering in marathon election coverage in 1967 when the TV & radio stations of the network aired election updates for 36 hours sharp – making it a national first.

Within weeks, another TV station in Dagupan opened its doors followed by the first broadcasts in Negros Island (through Bacolod) in 1963. Panay had its first station in Iloilo City which opened in 1964, the Soccsksargen region then followed up with the opening of its own regional station in 1965 and Baguio and Davao both followed suit in 1967.

Two years later, the network's first color test broadcasts began with the help of the Radio Corporation of America (RCA). Color broadcasts started in June 1966, the first in the Philippines and Southeast Asia as the network was tagged as the "First in Color Television", with full-color broadcasting beginning in 1971 in all national television stations.

On December 18, 1968, ABS-CBN opened its new Broadcast Center on Bohol Avenue (now Sgt. Esguerra Avenue in 1989), Quezon City, where it still stands today. At the time, it was the most advanced broadcast facility in Asia. The station again made breakthroughs by using the first live satellite transmissions from abroad, foremost of which was the 168-hour coverage of the first Moon landing in 1969 and the 1968 Summer Olympics in Mexico the year before. The network enjoyed a big portion of the ratings and won various awards and recognitions from different organizations. The network pioneered the first all-national news simulcasts also in the same year as well.

By 1972, the ABS-CBN network owned and operated two television stations and seven radio stations in Manila and 14 radio stations and three originating television stations in the provinces. In the same year, ABS-CBN launched its iconic "The Philippines' Largest Network" signature jingle — which is known for its now-familiar six-note leitmotif — composed by Phil Delfino.

1972–1978: Martial law era
The company suffered a setback for the first time upon the declaration of martial law by Ferdinand Marcos. On September 23, 1972, two days after the signing of Proclamation No. 1081, ABS-CBN and its affiliate stations were seized. Almost 10,000 employees lost their jobs as a result of the takeover and shutdown of ABS-CBN.

Eugenio López Jr., the president of the company, was arrested in November 1972, then imprisoned and held without trial for five years until he and his cellmate Sergio Osmeña III launched a daring jailbreak on October 1, 1977. They fled into exile in the United States together with their families.

The general manager of ABS-CBN, Almeda Lopez, was also jailed for a year for his protest activities. After his daring and successful escape from Fort Bonifacio, he joined López in exile in the United States and kept himself busy protesting the Marcos dictatorship from abroad. He was a key figure in the protest over the Bataan Nuclear Power Plant.

The network itself was taken over by Roberto Benedicto, a crony of Ferdinand Marcos, then-Philippines ambassador to Japan, and sugar plantation owner, who used the Broadcasting Center at Bohol Avenue, then renamed "Broadcast Plaza", as the home of Government Television/Maharlika Broadcasting System (GTV/MBS, originally from Intramuros) and Kanlaon Broadcasting System/Radio Philippines Network (KBS/RPN, after the studio in Pasay was destroyed by fire on June 6, 1973). DZAQ-TV Channel 2 was relaunched under Banahaw Broadcasting Corporation (BBC) on November 4, 1973, with a new call sign (DWWX-TV), logo, slogan and a theme song (composed by José Mari Chan entitled "Big Beautiful Country"). In 1978, BBC moved to new headquarters (together with RPN and the Intercontinental Broadcasting Corporation (IBC)) in Broadcast City (also in Diliman, Quezon City). DZXL-TV Channel 4 was taken over by the government agency National Media Production Center (NMPC) for the launch of Government Television (GTV) as DWGT-TV on February 2, 1974. The network's radio stations were also affected with BBC and KBS/RPN operating several of the stations. BBC and RPNs would pioneer the country's first true computer-generated imagery animations for station identifications in the early 1980s.

1986: Capture of Broadcast Plaza (MBS-4)
At the height of the People Power Revolution, military reformists—believing that television would be a powerful tool to aid the revolution—attacked and took over the ABS-CBN Broadcasting Center on February 24, 1986, former ABS-CBN talents put the station back on the air and televised the drama of the uprising as it unfolds, thereby contributing to the strength of the revolt. BBC, on the other hand, ceased operations after reformists shut down its transmitter in Panay Avenue (together with RPN and IBC, temporarily) on the following day as the Channel 2 frequency was turned over to the Lopezes on July 16, 1986.

1986–2020: Rebirth and growth
On March 1, 1986, after the People Power Revolution, Geny Lopez returned to the country after self-exile in the United States and started rebuilding the station from the rubbles after the revolution. Recovery was difficult and resources were low; former ABS-CBN employees Freddie García, Ben Aniceto and Rolly Cruz were brought in to rework the station's programming. The Presidential Commission on Good Government approved the return of the network's flagship station Channel 2 to the Lopezes on June 13, 1986. The Lopez family continued to own the network itself during the Marcos regime. Thus, ABS-CBN began to rebroadcast to viewers once again on September 14, 1986, with the TV special, "We're back!!", broadcasting from what used to be their main garage at the revived Broadcast Center in the pre-Martial Law days. Aniceto, who worked as the program director for radio and television of the network and station manager of Channel 2 in the 1970s, was served as the first vice president and general manager of ABS-CBN upon the network's reopening from 1986 to 1987 and its radio stations re-opened in July 1986.

As the People Power Revolution (commonly known as EDSA Revolution) broke out in early 1986, and Marcos' grip on power debilitated, the reformists in the military contended the broadcasting network would be a vital asset for victory. Thus, at 10 am on February 24, 1986, they attacked and took the ABS-CBN Broadcast Center that was then the home of MBS-4 and the long hibernation of the station ended in March. Former ABS-CBN talents put the station back on the air and televised the drama of the uprising as it unfolds, thereby contributing to the strength of the revolt. BBC, on the other hand, ceased operations after reformists shut down its transmitter in Panay Avenue (together with RPN and IBC, temporarily) on the following day as the Channel 2 frequency was turned over to the Lopezes on July 16, 1986.

In January 1987, the network was forced to share space in the building that was rightfully their own with the government TV station Channel 4 (until January 22, 1992). At the time, money had been scarce while resources were limited; offices were used as dressing rooms and other equipment such as chairs, tables, and phones were in short supply. Aniceto, who worked as the program director for radio and television of the network and station manager of Channel 2 in the 1970s, was served as the first vice president and general manager of ABS-CBN upon the network's reopening from 1986 to 1987 and its radio stations re-opened in July 1986.

On March 1, 1987, Channel 2 was relaunched with the live musical special, The Star Network: Ang Pagbabalík Ng Bituin (The Return of the Star) which noted for the then-brand-new numerical white tri-ribbon channel 2 logo with a white rhomboidal star (from 1988 to 1993 the ribbons were tri-coloured in red, green and blue) as a centerpiece of the network's revival. By 1988, ABS-CBN had regained its foothold in the Philippine TV ratings from dead last (#5) to being number 1 again nationally - as a result of the rebranding.

Within the year, ABS-CBN also beefed up its news programs with TV Patrol, anchored by a team of newsreaders composed of Noli de Castro, Mel Tiangco, Frankie Evangelista, and Angelique Lazo, with the late Ernie Baron telling the daily weather forecast. Other reputable news programmes followed, such as Magandang Gabi, Bayan as well as the cultural magazine show Tatak Pilipino hosted by the former anchor Gel Santos-Relos and former APO Hiking Society member Jim Paredes, and Hoy Gising!. The entertainment programs of ABS-CBN were also revamped with series that previously aired on RPN and IBC, which included Eat Bulaga!, Okey Ka Fairy Ko!, The Sharon Cuneta Show, Chika Chika Chicks, Goin' Bananas, Loveliness, Kapag May Katwiran, Ipaglaban Mo!, and Coney Reyes on Camera, while producing original content (initially co-productions with Regal Television), which included The Maricel Soriano Drama Special, Ryan Ryan Musikahan, Ang TV, Sa Linggo nAPO Sila, Showbiz Lingo, Oki Doki Doc, Mara Clara, Maalaala Mo Kaya, Palibhasa Lalake, Teysi ng Tahanan, Home Along Da Riles, and Wansapanataym.

Another feature of its return to the top of the ratings is the introduction of the live-action sentai and tokusatsu show formats from Japan, with Bioman, Goggle V, Gavan, and Shaider, the latter the first ever tokusatsu program to be aired in English and Filipino to Philippine television full-time (after a brief appearance on RPN). Filipino-dubbed anime programmes, another network and Philippine television first, would only begin in the transition to the 1990s, and 1987's Hikari Sentai Maskman, aired by the network, was the first ever sentai program to dub in Filipino.

Within months after the relaunch in Manila, the revived network also restarted regional programs and broadcasting starting in Baguio, Cebu, Bacolod, and Davao (and later in Zamboanga and Cagayan de Oro). Within the 1990s, the network also helped open new stations in other parts of the country, while reopening stations that were used before.

On December 11, 1988, with the first marathon broadcast of the Australian produced television miniseries A Dangerous Life, ABS-CBN began shifting to satellite broadcast, enabling the entire country to watch the same programs simultaneously. This was also the very year when the network began international broadcasts to Guam and Saipan, in the Northern Marianas, also via satellite, yet another first for Philippine and Asian television. At the same time, the network began to increase the number of local TV programs being aired and produced.

Slowly, the station inched its way to financial recovery, which it achieved by 1990, regularly garnering around 70% of the market and that year, the company was listed to the Manila Stock Exchange (MSE) before its merger with Makati Stock Exchange (MkSE) to form the Philippine Stock Exchange (PSE). In 1992, ABS-CBN Talent Center (now Star Magic) was formed and in 1993, ABS-CBN launched Star Cinema as the company began to diversify. In 1995, Star Records (now Star Music) was launched. In that year, ABS-CBN also launched their own website, ABS-CBN.com, the first Filipino television network in the World Wide Web. It was created by its IT department, Internet Media Group. (IMG, which later became ABS-CBN Interactive until its merger in 2015)
On March 30, 1998, ABS-CBN Holdings Corporation was incorporated as Worldtech Holdings Corporation, for the primary purpose of issuance of the Philippine Depository Receipt (PDR) and the acquisition and holding of shares of ABS-CBN Corporation. Its Philippine depository receipt (PDR) is traded in the Philippine Stock Exchange under the ticker symbol ABSP.

On September 24, 1994, ABS-CBN signed a historic deal with PanAmSat to bring the first trans-Pacific Asian programming to some two million Filipino immigrants in the United States. This deal would later gave birth to The Filipino Channel which is now available globally.

The network has also syndicated its programs for international audience through its ABS-CBN International Distribution division. Among the programs that gained popularity abroad are Pangako Sa 'Yo, Kay Tagal Kang Hinintay, Lobo, Sana Maulit Muli, Kahit Isang Saglit, and Be Careful With My Heart.

Nine years after the revival on March 30, 1995, Republic Act No. 7966 signed by President Fidel Ramos granted ABS-CBN its legislative franchise for the second time.

Geny Lopez died of cancer on June 29, 1999, in the United States. This happened six months before the network celebrated the millennium by unveiling a new logo and inaugurating its Millennium Transmitter in the corporation grounds, resulting in a clearer signal for its television and radio stations in Mega Manila.

In 2002, Finance Asia ranked ABS-CBN as the 8th best-managed company in the Philippines in its "Asia's Best Companies 2002" survey. The survey covers the performance of the top companies in 10 countries in Asia. Finance Asia polled institutional investors and equity analysts for this survey.

In 2003, during the 50th anniversary of Philippine television, ABS-CBN launched its present brand name, "Kapamilya" (literally means "a member of the family").
The network celebrated its golden anniversary in 2003. The network also launched a promo called "Treasure Hunt", where the people were invited to bring their oldest television, radio sets, microphones, and posters. The network also celebrated its 16-year reign in the TV ratings, with 13 of their shows included in the Top 15 daily programs in TV. ABS-CBN also launched several new shows including Beyblade, Crush Gear Turbo and Meteor Garden. The company also did a nationwide caravan, showcasing the network's talents.

In October 2003, the network held a month-long celebration of ABS-CBN and Philippine TV's 50th year. The station produced two commemorative documentaries about the station's contribution in news and entertainment. Sa Mata ng Balita encapsulated some of the most unforgettable, most remarkable, and most celebrated landmarks of the last 50 years, as captured by television news. 50 Taong Ligawan: The Pinoy TV History, on the other hand, was the first extensive television documentary done about the history of Philippine television and the evolution of Philippine entertainment.

In 2004, the network launched a series of new programs including Marina, Sarah the Teen Princess, At Home Ka Dito, Nginiiig, Yes, Yes Show!, Mangarap Ka, Art Jam, Salamat Dok, Rated K, and a televised search for the network's new set of young talent entitled Star Circle Quest. During the last quarter of that same year, ABS-CBN lost its position as the leading network in Mega Manila to GMA Network following the success of the latter's fantaserye Mulawin which caused Charo Santos-Concio to almost resign from the network whereas it still dominated the TV ratings in Visayas and Mindanao.

In 2005, the network launched a series of new programs in their bid to regain lost audience share through a campaign entitled Iba Magmahal ang Kapamilya. These include Home Boy, Goin' Bulilit, Wowowee, Bora, Search for the Star in a Million and Quizon Avenue. In March of that same year, responding to Perceptions Inc.'s Tara Na, Biyahe Tayo, ABS-CBN and Star Records teamed up with the Philippine Tourism Authority (now the Tourism Infrastructure and Enterprise Zone Authority) for an all-star version of their Pilipino Sa Turismo'y Aktibo tourism anthem which featured selected contract artists such as Gary Valenciano, Kris Aquino, Ai-Ai delas Alas, Vhong Navarro, Piolo Pascual, Jericho Rosales, Claudine Barretto, Erik Santos, Gloc-9, Sheryn Regis and Heart Evangelista. However, the song's lack of extensive support by the mother network led to its obscurity.

The network later ventured into franchised reality shows with the launch of Pinoy Big Brother which proved to be a smashing success and helped them regain their lost position as the leading network in Mega Manila. A few months later, they snatched the rights to air the eighth season of the live-action preschool series Barney & Friends (which was a top-rater on American public television broadcaster PBS) on weekday mornings before the general entertainment programs.

In August 2007, ABS-CBN welcomed back former GMA Network artist Angel Locsin to its roster of talents which was seen as a controversial headlines because of her leading GMA's top-rating soaps; she actually started in ABS-CBN as part of a Star Circle batch six years earlier.

In 2008, ABS-CBN celebrated the 55th year of Philippine television. A new station ID entitled "Beyond Television" was also launched. The anniversary TV plug depicts the growth of ABS-CBN from a small television station that started in 1953 into a media conglomerate that has businesses beyond television. It is also on this year that The Wall Street Journal Asia ranked ABS-CBN as the 7th most admired company of the Philippines and 3rd in the Innovation Award category for its innovation in internet TV with TFC Now! (now iWant TFC) service.

During the historic presidential election of 2010, in response to the first automation of the election in the country, ABS-CBN utilized a technology from Orad Hi Tech Systems Ltd. that utilizes the principles of augmented reality. The technology uses real-time image processing system for live broadcasts of 3D computer-generated imagery against a real set or background. ABS-CBN also utilized what was probably the biggest touch screen display to be used in a Philippine television show. A new set dubbed as the "WAR" (Wireless Audience Response) room was specifically designed for the said election coverage. The coverage of ABS-CBN became the third top trending topic worldwide on the social networking site Twitter.

In May 2010, the conglomerate started to adapt the "ABS-CBN Corporation" name to reflect the company's diversification, although the name "ABS-CBN Broadcasting Corporation" is still used alternatively nowadays on some uses. According to Eugenio Lopez, Chairman of ABS-CBN Corporation, "It is a response to the changes in the media landscape brought about by technology. The media business has gone beyond merely broadcasting to encompass other platforms."

On January 1, 2013, coinciding with the kick-off of their 60th anniversary celebrations, Charo Santos-Concio was appointed as the new chief executive officer of the company, taking over from Gabby Lopez. Lopez remains the chairman of the company.

On May 28, 2013, ABS-CBN Corporation, through its subsidiary ABS-CBN Convergence, Inc. (formerly known as Multi-Media Telephony, Inc.), signed a network sharing agreement with Globe Telecom for a new mobile telephony service in the country. The agreement includes the sharing of assets including switches, towers, servers, and frequencies. ABS-CBN is expected to spend between 2 and 3 billion pesos for the next two years to build up its telco business. The plan has been approved by the National Telecommunications Commission and now operates as ABS-CBNmobile. It ceased operations on November 30, 2018, after both ABS-CBN and Globe decided not to renew their network-sharing agreement after assessing its mobile business model as financially unsustainable. The two companies will remain committed for partnership for content sharing using its existing resources.

In July 2013, ABS-CBN started the development of KidZania Manila family entertainment center in Bonifacio Global City in Taguig. However, due to the losses amid the COVID-19 pandemic in the country, KidZania Manila was permanently closed on August 31, 2020.

On May 30, 2014, ABS-CBN and its current president and CEO Charo Santos-Concio received the Gold Stevie Awards for the categories Services Company of the Year - Philippines and Woman of the Year at the Asia-Pacific Stevie Awards held in the Lotte Hotel, Seoul, South Korea. ABS-CBN also received the coveted Gold Stevie Awards for the category Company of the Year - Media & Entertainment at the 11th annual International Business Awards (IBA) which was held in Paris, France, on October 10. As a result of the win, ABS-CBN also won the vote-based People's Choice Stevie Awards for Favorite Companies in the Media and Entertainment Category, while their chairman Eugenio Lopez III received the lifetime achievement award from the KBP.

On March 19, 2015, Finance Asia ranked ABS-CBN as the third-best mid-cap company in the Philippines. ABS-CBN is the only Filipino media company included on Asia's best companies 2015 list of Finance Asia. Also in this year, ABS-CBN was included on the 2015 Top Companies report of JobStreet.com which rank the country's top employers. ABS-CBN is ranked 7th on the list.

On January 1, 2016, Carlo L. Katigbak was appointed as the new president and chief executive officer of the company, taking over from Charo Santos-Concio, who have succeeded her mandatory retirement age of 60. Concio will still be the network's chief content officer, president of the newly created ABS-CBN University, and executive adviser to the chairman of the company. One month later, the network also announced the appointment of Head for Free TV Maria Socorro Vidanes as the COO for broadcast of ABS-CBN effective February 1, 2016.

In 2016, ABS-CBN Corporation is the only media company included on the top ten 2016 Top Companies of JobStreet.com in the Philippines ranking, at number ten. These companies are chosen by JobStreet.com as the "most desired employers" in the country.

On April 19, 2018, during the company's annual stockholders meeting, the ABS-CBN Board of Directors voted in favor and elected Eugenio "Gabby" Lopez III as the Chairman Emeritus and his cousin, Chief Technology Officer Martin "Mark" Lopez as his successor as chairman of the network. Gabby Lopez will be the second executive to be elected as Chairman Emeritus, succeeding his late father, Eugenio "Geny" Lopez, Jr.
In February 2017, ABS-CBN upgraded Control Rooms 3 and 10 at its TV production studios in Quezon City with identical Lawo mc256 audio consoles. The new consoles replaced two dated desks and were installed by Broadcast Communications International, the main contractor for the upgrade. The IP-based Lawo production consoles – each with 64 faders and providing 270 DSP channels, a routing capacity of 5120×5120 crosspoints, integrated Waves SoundGrid servers and connectivity via four DALLIS I/O frames, mark the first Lawo equipment installations in the Philippines. The modernized IP-ready studio control rooms went on-air in January 2018.

In June 2018, it received the YouTube Diamond Creator Award for being the first YouTube channel in the Philippines to reach 10 million subscribers for its entertainment channel. The channel is also one of the only three channels in Southeast Asia to have reached the milestone on the popular video-sharing platform, after Thai TV network Workpoint and Thai entertainment company GMM Grammy. It also becomes the first YouTube channel in the Philippines to hit 20 and 30 million subscribers.

In July 2018, ABS-CBN won a prestigious Gold Quill award of excellence at the International Association of Business Communicators (IABC) Gold Quill Awards in Montreal, Canada for its "Wow at Saya" audience experience program for the network's live shows such as It's Showtime and ASAP Natin 'To.

In 2018, ABS CBN won 30 awards during the 16th Gawad Tanglaw awards and also won 34 awards during the 32nd Star Awards for Television for their good TV programs and personalities.

Also, in December of the same year, ABS-CBN inaugurated its new state-of-the-art sound stages studio complex called Horizon IT Park located at San Jose del Monte, Bulacan which was on par with Hollywood standards. The Phase 1 of the project includes its first two sound stages each sized of 1,500 square meters, with the first stage was named for its chairman emeritus, Eugenio Lopez III who visioned of the new studios, The EL3 Stage. The complex also includes backlots, facilities for its production and post-production, and offices. The studios will be used for its upcoming teleserye The Faithful Wife and its reality singing competition show, Idol Philippines, using the name as "Idol City".

In September 2019, ABS-CBN had announced that it would be venturing into Hollywood production for the US film and TV outfit Electric Entertainment which is headed by Filipino-American producer Dean Devlin with a U.S. crime series Almost Paradise, set in Cebu and would air in the United States via the cable company, WGN America. It was ABS-CBN's first foray into Hollywood television production. The series' production in Bigfoot Soundstage in Cebu began filming in November 2019.

Horizon IT Park

In 2011, ABS-CBN announced the development of a state-of-the-art studio complex in San Jose del Monte, Bulacan, which is on par with Hollywood standards for a projected cost of 6 to 7.5 billion pesos. A 120 hectare lot in San Jose del Monte, Bulacan was acquired earlier that year for 75 million pesos. In 2014, it was announced that the studio complex will consist of 10 sound stages and backlots each. The company plan to build at least two sound stages a year for a cost of 600 million pesos or 300 million pesos for each sound stage.

The proper of the project started in the first quarter of 2014 with its construction commenced in May 2017. The production and support teams for both TV and feature films began a three-year training program for the stages both in Hollywood and the Philippines to ensure that production processes mirror the best practices in the world.

On December 12, 2018, after years of planning and training, ABS-CBN inaugurated its new state-of-the-art studio complex which is revealed to be called Horizon IT Park. The complex was designed by California-based architecture firm Bastien and Associates, Filipino firm AIDEA, with a consultants from Hollywood-based Manhattan Beach Studios. The Phase 1 of the project includes its first two sound stages sized at 1,500 square meters, with the first stage named for its chairman emeritus, Eugenio "Gabby" Lopez III who is the brainchild of the new studio complex, The EL3 Stage. The complex will also include backlots, facilities for its production and post-production and offices. The new studios will be used for the upcoming teleserye The Faithful Wife, and its most anticipated movie, Darna. A new soundstage was finally used for its reality singing competition show, Idol Philippines, using the name as "Idol City".

2020: COVID-19 pandemic, franchise renewal issue and shutdown

On February 10, 2020, it was announced that Solicitor General Jose Calida has submitted a petition to the Philippine Supreme Court to end ABS-CBN's franchise due to allegations that foreigners were allowed to be involved in the company's ownership.

On March 10, 2020, in the wake of the World Health Organization-declared COVID-19 pandemic that had also spread across the Philippines, as well as President Rodrigo Duterte's declaration of state of public health emergency after the first local transmission of COVID-19 was confirmed, ABS-CBN announced that it would temporarily suspend its admission of studio audience in tapings for its game, talk, variety and reality shows, including Magandang Buhay, It's Showtime, ASAP Natin 'To, Banana Sundae and the second season of the Philippine version of South Korean game show I Can See Your Voice, to provide safety and well-being to its artists, crew and production teams. The aforementioned shows would, however, continue to air in production without a studio audience.

Then, on March 15, 2020, ABS-CBN temporarily suspended production of its entertainment shows, after Metro Manila was put under a community quarantine (partial lockdown), later turned into an enhanced community quarantine in the entire Luzon (total lockdown). Among the prime time shows affected included Pamilya Ko, FPJ's Ang Probinsyano, Make It with You (later canceled without completing its story in June 2020) and A Soldier's Heart, which were all put on hold from March 16, 2020, until May/June 2020. The network aired reruns of some teleseryes and other programs including 100 Days to Heaven, May Bukas Pa, On the Wings of Love, The Legal Wife, Got to Believe, Walang Hanggan, Wildflower, Wansapanataym, iWant Originals Series, Tubig at Langis, Your Face Sounds Familiar Kids Season 1, Pilipinas Got Talent Season 6, Bayani, Hiraya Manawari and Sine'skwela.

On May 5, 2020, ABS-CBN was issued a cease-and-desist order by the National Telecommunications Commission (NTC) and Solicitor General Jose Calida after the NTC refused to renew the network's franchise license earlier in February 2020. After meeting controversy and national outcry over the initial NTC refusal, ABS-CBN was initially allowed to operate under a temporary license, with support from both senate and congress. Investigations by various government offices showed that the company had no deficiencies or issues. There are allegations that the NTC refusal over the franchise renewal was based on the network's critical news coverage of President Rodrigo Duterte's administration. The franchise license expired on May 4, 2020, and a day later, ABS-CBN officially signed off in the evening. This was the second time the network went off-air after the declaration of martial law by Former President Ferdinand Marcos on September 23, 1972. ABS-CBN was forced to suspend operations for all of its physical broadcasting channels (with the exception of Cine Mo!, Yey!, Kapamilya Box Office (KBO) through a blocktime agreement with the AMCARA Broadcasting Network in Metro Manila, Laguna, Iloilo and some portions of Baguio and the cable channels run by the Creative Programs subsidiary of the company). The franchise was in the process of renewal, but had however been delayed due to the extension of the enhanced community quarantine to May 15, 2020, 11 days after the scheduled expiration. The network went off-air at exactly 7:52 pm (PST) of May 5.

On June 30, 2020, the NTC issued an alias cease and desist order to ABS-CBN to stop its digital TV transmission on Channel 43 in Metro Manila, as well as a cease and desist order to stop Sky Cable's direct broadcast satellite service Sky Direct.

On July 10, 2020, members of the House of Representatives, particularly the Committee on Legislative Franchises, voted 70–11 to deny the franchise application of ABS-CBN, citing several issues on the network's franchise. Only about 12.94% of the Congress voted for franchise renewal. As a result, the network is forced to cease the operations of some of its businesses and laid off its workers by the end of August 2020. Its President and CEO, Carlo Katigbak said the company remains committed to the public service, with hoping to find other ways to pursue their mission. According to a survey released by the Social Weather Stations or SWS that was released following the rejection of the network's franchise renewal, showed that an overwhelming majority (75%) of all Filipinos want the network back.

As a result, ABS-CBN Corporation was forced to cease the operations of some of its businesses and lay off its workers on August 31, 2020. The number of people who lost their jobs was estimated at 11,000.

On September 10, 2020, the National Telecommunications Commission issued an order to recall all frequencies of the network as it no longer obtains a valid congressional franchise to continue operating as it is disqualified from operating. And on January 5, 2022, its television frequencies (both analog and digital) were already assigned to Villar-owned Advanced Media Broadcasting System.

2020–present: Shifting to new media and other businesses
Following the rejection of their broadcast franchise, ABS-CBN shifted its focus on platforms that do not require legislative franchise. These include international licensing and distribution, digital and cable platforms, content syndication via different streaming services and block-timing with different TV networks.

In an interview with ABS-CBN News chief Ging Reyes, said the media network is set in shifting its operations online and she hopes that they could continue their good performance in terms of audience engagement, being the number one news digital property in the country. Once the COVID-19 pandemic is over, ABS-CBN plans to create additional programs apart from TV Patrol and produce more online video content and rebuild ABS-CBN's current news affairs lineup in the future such as making documentaries.

Also, in a separate interview with Star Magic head Laurenti Dyogi, he said they are looking for new opportunities and that they would like to venture into international production and the prospect of going beyond the Philippine territory. ABS-CBN and Star Magic would like to be a major player locally and globally by partnering with Netflix, WeTV iflix, Viu and other over-the-top platforms for their content. Back in 2019, the network co-produced with American film production company Electric Entertainment for the crime drama television series Almost Paradise. It was the network's first taste of a North American production, and a second season of the series is in the planning stage.

On June 15, 2020, ABS-CBN announced its partnership with GMMTV, a leading content company in Thailand, as it bagged the television and over-the-top rights to air eight GMMTV drama series dubbed in Filipino and was shown on Kapamilya Channel and iWantTFC. First to air was the top-trending boys' love (BL) romantic comedy, 2gether: The Series. The sequel, Still 2gether, was also shown on August 15, 2020, with a one-day delayed telecast from Thailand. A stronger partnership between ABS-CBN and GMMTV is expected as they explore co-production of film and television content, music, and live entertainment. One of them is a virtual fan event called "BrightWin Manila: The Virtual Fan Meet" which was held via KTX on December 5, 2020, after the success of Hello Stranger: The Final FanCon due to the rising popularity of boys' love (BL) series during the COVID-19 pandemic. Both networks are also collaborating to co-produce a project starring one of 2gether: The series lead actors and an ABS-CBN artist under Dreamscape Entertainment. The project is currently under development.

On August 17, 2020, the drama series Ang sa Iyo ay Akin was the first original digital teleserye to be broadcast on Kapamilya Channel and Kapamilya Online Live during the time of the COVID-19 pandemic. Some of the scenes were shot in the ABS-CBN Soundstage inside the Horizon IT Park in Bulacan.

On April 13, 2021, ABS-CBN announced a collaboration with BBC and BBC Studios for the Philippine adaptation of Doctor Foster, entitled The Broken Marriage Vow.

In June 2021, ABS-CBN promoted the Netflix animated series Trese (featuring a Filipino voice cast led by Liza Soberano) by replacing the logo outside the network's headquarters in Quezon City with the logo of ABC-ZNN, a fictional media company used in the animated series.

In August 2021, ABS-CBN has acquired the animated series based on the hit mobile game Mobile Legends: Bang Bang, entitled The Legends of Dawn: The Sacred Stone. A GMMTV drama series F4 Thailand: Boys Over Flowers is also slated to air on the network's platforms.

 Kapamilya Channel 

On June 4, 2020, ABS-CBN announced on TV Patrol that the cable-and-satellite Kapamilya Channel launched on June 13, serving as the interim replacement of ABS-CBN terrestrial network, and thus resuming the production of ABS-CBN's drama and live entertainment shows and the airing its entertainment, educational and current affairs programming, along with films. A high-definition counterpart was also launched on Sky Cable and Destiny Cable Channel 167 replacing the now-defunct ABS-CBN HD.

 iWant TFC and The Filipino Channel 

On August 24, 2020, ABS-CBN announced that they will be merging iWant and TFC Online starting September 1 and will be migrating to a new system that will be accessible worldwide and will be called iWantTFC. It offers live video streamings and video on demand of content produced by ABS-CBN, new features such as offline viewing of select movies and series, as well as an enhanced viewing experience on bigger screens through select smart TV brands and digital media players.

In early February 2021, seven TFC channels went live with Amagi cloud platform to consolidate its play-out operations on the cloud to expand its reach and gain greater flexibility. Amagi is a global leader in SaaS for broadcast and streaming TV. ABS-CBN now manages end-to-end workflow on the cloud, eliminating the need for expensive hardware and broadcast center operations, giving it the flexibility to run its global channels with live news from anywhere. Amagi clients include A+E Networks, beIN Sports, Discovery Networks, IMG and WarnerMedia, among others.

The Filipino Channel also launched its new and improved programming lineup with the introduction of time blocks similar to Kapamilya Channel, new shows and more viewing options while it has successfully completed its migration to high-definition in all of its international feed on February 20, 2021, which is available in iWantTFC, TFC IPTV and TFC Direct via cable and satellite.

 Other platforms 
On May 7, 2020, two days after the halt of ABS-CBN's TV and radio broadcast, TV Patrol announced it would continue delivering the news through ABS-CBN News official YouTube channel and Facebook page via live-stream, geo-blocked in the Philippines. This was followed by The World Tonight on July 27, 2020.

On June 13, 2020, It's Showtime: Online Ü resumed its broadcast on It's Showtime official YouTube channel and Facebook page simulcast from Kapamilya Channel.

On July 31, 2020, ABS-CBN announced the launch of Kapamilya Online Live, an online entertainment channel that will be streamed on two online video-sharing platforms without any subscription fee. It began to stream on August 1, 2020, and is available both on ABS-CBN Entertainment's YouTube channel and Facebook page as the network shifts efforts to digital platforms. Live-streams are presented in 1080p HD format. It also starts to offer a video on demand service of its shows accessible for seven days after their original streaming date. ABS-CBN Entertainment currently has more than 60 million followers combined in Facebook and YouTube.

Aside from Kapamilya Online Live, selected ABS-CBN shows are independently live-streaming on several YouTube channels and Facebook pages owned by the network.

Launched in August 2020, KTX also known as Kapamilya Tickets is an online ticketing and streaming platform which enables its users to purchase tickets to advance screening of ABS-CBN shows, movies, digital concerts and other event production attractions, as well as avail tickets to ABS-CBN programs to be part of their virtual audience via Zoom. Continuing its digital shift, ABS-CBN is turning to digital events through KTX while big live events are prohibited during the COVID-19 pandemic. It held its first digital fan conference that marked the finale of the BL series Hello Stranger which later was shown on Kapamilya Online Live and TFC. Originally launched in May 2017, KTX used to be a ticketing portal for ABS-CBN Studio Tour to shows such as It's Showtime and ASAP Natin 'To before the pandemic lockdown. Most notable digital shows handled by KTX include Miss Universe Philippines 2020, The Fact Music Awards 2020, BrightWin Manila: The Virtual Fan Meet, Freedom: Regine Velasquez-Alcasid Digital Concert and Sarah Geronimo Tala: The Film Concert. A new revamp on its web user interface was launched on March 30, 2021.

In October 2020, ABS-CBN partnered with Kumu to launch the ninth season of reality TV show Pinoy Big Brother: Connect amid the COVID-19 pandemic. The app hosted online auditions for the reality show, which attracted over 100,000 new users, and it also live-streamed activities inside the Big Brother House when the show premiered.
The partnership between the two parties entails greater visibility for ABS-CBN's artists and talents outside of mainstream media, with Kumu providing an alternative channel for said artists to connect with their large fan bases locally. It's currently live-streaming Game Ka Na Ba?, the first game show in the world to be watched on television and played on a mobile app, separate channels for FYE, MOR Entertainment, Myx, SeenZone as well as artist from BGYO, BINI, MNL48, Star Magic, Star Hunt, Polaris, Star Music and Rise Artist Studio.

On November 11, 2020, ABS-CBN announced that viewers worldwide will have free access to TV Patrol on ABS-CBN News YouTube and Facebook account, lifting the geo-blocking to the said show while local viewers will also be able to live-stream and catch up on episodes of various ANC and TeleRadyo shows for the first time. ABS-CBN News completely lifted the use of geo-blocking to all of its content on March 1, 2021.

The ABS-CBN Radio Service is an app that let its users to have access to the exclusive news, talk and music content directly from their mobile device no matter where they are located in the world. It live-streams audio from Teleradyo and the most recently added MOR Entertainment and MyxRadio while latest podcast from selected ABS-CBN News and ANC programs such as TV Patrol are available on demand. The said app is part of ABS-CBN Digital Media division in partnership with Zeno Media and is currently available on iOS and Android devices free of charge.

 Blocktime deals and partnership agreements 
 Blocktime deals with other networks 

On October 6, 2020, ABS-CBN Corporation announced that they will air its shows and movies back on Free TV via the new "A2Z" channel starting October 10, 2020. It is a blocktime agreement between the media conglomerate and ZOE Broadcasting Network. A month later, Minority Leader and Congressman Joseph Stephen Paduano of Abang Lingkod Party List called for an investigation into the ABS-CBN-A2Z Channel 11 blocktime deal. The National Telecommunications Commission (NTC) and Bureau of Internal Revenue (BIR) were told to investigate.

On January 18, 2021, ABS-CBN Corporation and TV5 were allegedly doing a partnership agreement to further expand the reach of Kapamilya Network on Free TV. There are some possible results that most of ABS-CBN shows and programs that were not able to be broadcast on ABS-CBN and ZOE's A2Z Channel 11 will be aired on TV5.

On January 21, 2021, ABS-CBN jointly announced with TV5 and Cignal TV, in conjunction with Brightlight Productions, that both ASAP Natin 'To and the FPJ: Da King movie block will be simulcasted on the Kapatid network's lineup every Sunday afternoon beginning January 24, 2021. This also marks the first time that ABS-CBN programs will be aired on free-to-air television nationwide since the May 5, 2020 shutdown. Despite this development, both shows will continue to air on Kapamilya Channel, Kapamilya Online Live (except FPJ: Da King), and A2Z Channel 11.

On March 5, 2021, ABS-CBN and TV5/Cignal announced that TV5 will also simulcast the ABS-CBN/Kapamilya Channel's Primetime Bida lineup beginning March 8.

On April 5, 2022, ABS-CBN and GMA Network forged a partnership that will bring Star Cinema movies to GMA's local channels.

On April 6, 2022, ABS-CBN jointly announced with Broadcast Enterprises and Affiliated Media to launch its TV channel "PIE'" in partnership with the conglomerate, Kroma Entertainment and 917Ventures.

In June 2022, ABS-CBN engaged into advanced talks with TV5's parent company, MediaQuest Holdings to allow its resources combined after Villar Group-backed Advanced Media Broadcasting System acquired ABS-CBN's former frequency, and began operations on September 13 as All TV-2. On August 10, 2022, ABS-CBN and MediaQuest Holdings signed a "convertible note agreement" as announced on the following day for the ABS-CBN's investment into TV5 Network by acquiring 34.99% of the company's common shares, with an option to increase it stake to 49.92% within the next eight years with MediaQuest remained as the TV5's controlling shareholder with 64.79% of TV5's common shares. Meanwhile, MediaQuest Holdings executed a "debt instruments agreement" by acquiring a 38.88% minority stake of ABS-CBN's cable TV arm Sky Cable Corporation through Cignal TV, with an option to acquire an additional 61.12% of Sky Cable shares within the next eight years. On August 16, the House of Representatives originally schedule a briefing on the investment of ABS-CBN and TV5 deal on August 18, however, it was silently cancelled on the following day. On August 24, the two broadcasting companies agreed to pause their closing preparations for the deal following concerns from politicians and some government agencies. However, the agreement was terminated on September 1.

In September 2022, ABS-CBN and Advanced Media Broadcasting System announced that All TV will air reruns of their respective drama series on September 14, apart from the original programs.

 Streaming partnerships 
On March 18, 2021, ABS-CBN and WeTV iflix announced a landmark partnership that brings the Kapamilya network's primetime programs, including FPJ's Ang Probinsyano to the two streaming platforms starting March 20, with early access for subscribed users. Viewers can watch brand new series first as it premieres on WeTV and iflix VIP 46 hours before it airs on local TV.

On October 11, 2021, during the 26th Busan International Film Festival, iQiyi partnered with ABS-CBN to release two Philippine series exclusively on the streaming platform later this year. It is considered to be their first local originals in Southeast Asia.

On January 15, 2022, they launched on Viu with partnered on ABS-CBN to release a hit adaptation The Broken Marriage Vow starting on January 22, 2022, on the 48 Hours Free TV Broadcast. On January 23, 2023 a historic collab between ABS-CBN and GMA Network has been announced and will release their first series Unbreak My Heart and will be streamed on Viu in 15 international territories in 2023.

On February 7, 2022, ABS-CBN and YouTube announced its partnership to develop and produce a new original series that will stream exclusively on the video-streaming platform. Based on the co-production deal, ABS-CBN will develop a romantic-comedy series called How to Move On in 30 Days which will premiere the same year.

On April 19, 2022, ABS-CBN and Netflix closed a groundbreaking simulcast deal wherein 2 Good 2 Be True will have an exclusive 72-hour window on the global streaming platform before its episodes aired on television.

Digital transition

Digital terrestrial television

ABS-CBN Corporation initially applied for a license from the National Telecommunications Commission to operate a digital terrestrial television service in the country back in 2007. ABS-CBN planned to utilize multiplex to offer ABS-CBN, S+A, and 5 additional specialty TV channels. The conglomerate was expected to spend at least 1 billion pesos annually for the next 5 years for its DTT transition. ABS-CBN utilized UHF channel 51 Manila (695.143 MHz), later UHF Channel 43 (647.143 MHz), for test broadcasts in the DVB-T format. ABS-CBN was expected to begin digital test broadcasts in January 2009.

In June 2010, the NTC announced that it would formally adopt the Japanese standard ISDB-T for digital broadcasting and issued a circular commanding all the country's television networks to switch-off their analog services on December 31, 2015, at 11:59 p.m. Philippine Standard Time (UTC+8). But due to delay of the release of the implementing rules and regulations for digital television broadcast, the target date was moved to 2023.

In April 2011, the conglomerate announced further details about its DTT plans, which would offer ABS-CBN and Studio 23 (currently S+A). In addition, four new channels which will be exclusively available to its digital users will be offered once the digital broadcast start. The specialty TV channel lineup will include one news channel, one youth-oriented channel, an educational channel, and a movie channel. The conglomerate was also planning to utilize the 1seg (one segment) broadcast standard for handheld devices.Exclusive: The ABS-CBN Digital TV  retrieved October 18, 2013

In September 2014, ABS-CBN soft-launched its DTT service started selling ISDB-T receivers in selected barangays in Metro Manila under Sky TV+ brand. Later, it was rebranded as ABS-CBN TVplus.

On February 11, 2015, ABS-CBN formally launched its DTT service under the name ABS-CBN TVplus in a formal switch-over ceremony held at the ABS-CBN Broadcasting Center. The ABS-CBN TVplus service has four exclusive TV channels which are free of charge; these are movie channel Cine Mo!, news channel DZMM TeleRadyo, educational channel Knowledge Channel, and kids channel Yey!. In addition to ABS-CBN and S+A, all non-encrypted digital terrestrial broadcast within the area was also carried by the service. ABS-CBN TVplus also provides pay per view, EWBS, and BML services. As of February 2020, ABS-CBN TVplus has sold over 9 million units of its set-top boxes.

High-definition television

In 2007, ABS-CBN produced the first ever Filipino TV series to be shot in high-definition. This was Rounin, a science fiction, fantasy series created by Erik Matti. This was followed by Budoy in 2011. Prior to this, big-budget series like Esperanza, Mula sa Puso, Pangako Sa 'Yo, and Kay Tagal Kang Hinintay were shot in 16mm film with a 4:3 aspect ratios while low budget series, on the other hand, were shot in smaller formats. ABS-CBN's drama anthology Maalaala Mo Kaya was produced in 16:9 aspect ratio from 2008 to 2022 (with the episodes being letterboxed if aired on standard definition television (SDTV)). The network's last drama series to be produced in 4:3 aspect ratio is Moon of Desire which aired from March 31 to August 15, 2014, while the last program overall to be produced and aired on a said aspect ratio are the ABS-CBN News and Current Affairs programs such as Umagang Kay Ganda, TV Patrol, and Bandila where they were switched to high definition (1080i, 16:9 HDTV) format on April 2, 2018. Beginning with Sana Bukas pa ang Kahapon on June 16, 2014, all of ABS-CBN's TV series were all produced in high-definition format. Ningning was the first Filipino TV series to be broadcast in HD on October 5, 2015, while Maalaala Mo Kaya was the first mini-series to do so the day before. On the other hand, the first ever locally produced live entertainment program to be broadcast in HD was the musical variety show ASAP on October 4, 2015. The aspect ratio of the network's break bumper was changed from 4:3 to 16:9 on June 13, 2016 (coinciding with the media conglomerate's 70th anniversary). Overall, TV broadcast contents on ABS-CBN in 4:3 aspect ratio were originally aired and produced until April 1, 2018. Since April 2, 2018, broadcast contents on ABS-CBN are now all in 16:9 aspect ratio thus the network phased out the production of contents in 4:3 ratio on the said date.

In 2008, ABS-CBN began moving to a fully tapeless workflow and since then, the network has digitalized all areas of its production. ABS-CBN eventually completed its plan to upgrade its studios facilities from SD definition to HD definition for the ad play out in September 2010. The increasing demand of high-impact HD commercial content from their clients and audiences pushed ABS-CBN to definitely setting up the ad play out of more than 20 cable TV channels with Etere MTX system. MTX system is used as a quick content player with fast access to all video commercials, able to play multiple formats with no conversion. The network moves to MTX in April 2013, as it is planning a refurbishment of its regional stations across the country that will include an Enterprise MAM video exchange based on Etere technologies. ABS-CBN has a plan to refurbish and innovate all its regional stations to allow their playout systems to be synchronized with the main playout facility. The 1st installation is performed in Dagupan and the project is expected to be completed in 2 years. ABS-CBN's regional stations are mainly running low-cost, low performance hardware and software, far away from broadcast affordability and performances. In order to achieve this goal, the network will extend their Etere systems to all the regional stations. The playout and video management system will be based on MTX, with a pure “software only” approach, all the traditional video hardware is replaced by software, including master switcher and logo generator.

On April 19, 2009, Sony announced the acquisition of ABS-CBN of 24 units of its Sony high-definition professional video cameras through a press release published on Sony's official website. On July 11, 2009, ABS-CBN launched a high definition feed of Balls (now S+A HD) in SkyCable under the name Balls HD, the first local high-definition TV channel in the history of Philippine television. On the same day, Balls HD broadcast the first locally produced coverage of an event in high-definition, the UAAP Season 72 basketball game which was produced by ABS-CBN Sports. In addition, two of its three news helicopters are capable of transmitting high-definition live feeds from its 5 axis gimbal HD camera mounted on the aircraft.

On April 20, 2010, Ikegami, a Japanese manufacturer of professional and broadcast television equipment announced the acquisition of ABS-CBN of 75 units of Ikegami high-definition professional video cameras for electronic newsgathering.

On October 3, 2015, ABS-CBN launched a high-definition feed in SkyCable and Destiny Cable under the name ABS-CBN HD. This marked the Philippines' first commercial television network to be launched in high-definition. The said channel will broadcast selected shows of ABS-CBN in a true high-definition picture while the remaining shows will be broadcast in upscaled standard definition picture with pillarbox to preserve its original 4:3 aspect ratio. ABS-CBN HD was also made available on Sky Direct, iWant, and Sky On Demand.

On May 5, 2020, ABS-CBN HD dissolved its operations, together with its SD feed and other ABS-CBN's free TV and radio stations, following the cease-and-desist order from the National Telecommunications Commission after its legislative franchise expired on May 4.

Tapeless

In 2007, in preparation for digital and high-definition television broadcasting, ABS-CBN acquired server and post-production technologies developed by EVS Broadcast Equipment, making ABS-CBN the first broadcaster in Southeast Asia to go tapeless. EVS provided ABS-CBN a 100 percent digital and non-linear editing system andpost-production workflow as well as wireless access through a media access management system servers installed in outside broadcasting van. This will be integrated to technologies developed by Avid Technology, Snell, and Ruckus Wireless.

Digital archiving
ABS-CBN started digitizing its film and television content in 2004. Further expansions both locally and globally started in 2008 with the integration of its playlist import. In 2010, ABS-CBN started to replace SeaChange International servers with Harmonic Inc. and Etere managing a multi-server, multi-channel system; they also started the HD playout using the Channel in a box technology of Etere MTX.

In 2007, ABS-CBN acquired a Media Asset Management System (MAMS) from IBM Corporation for a cost of US$4 million. The IBM MAMS includes a hardware infrastructure support and 2 petabytes (2000 terabytes) of data storage that was expected to grow by 36 percent over the next few years as ABS-CBN was already generating over 700 hours of content a month. The MAMS will be integrated to the million dollar Dalet Digital Media Systems and Avid Unity ISIS (Infinitely Scalable Intelligent Storage)  that will enable ABS-CBN to digitize and store its over 200,000 hours of television content and its library of over 2000 films. As of 2016, ABS-CBN Film Archives, in partnership with Central Digital Lab, Inc., has digitized, restored, and remastered over 100 films which includes classics such as Himala, Oro, Plata, Mata, and Ganito Kami Noon... Paano Kayo Ngayon?''.

References

 
 
Conglomerate companies of the Philippines
Entertainment companies of the Philippines
Broadcasting companies of the Philippines
Mass media companies of the Philippines
Mass media in Metro Manila
Entertainment companies established in 1946
Mass media companies established in 1946
1946 establishments in the Philippines
1953 establishments in the Philippines
1967 mergers and acquisitions
Companies based in Quezon City
Companies listed on the Philippine Stock Exchange
Digital terrestrial television in the Philippines
Filipino-language television stations
Television networks in the Philippines
Television channels and stations established in 1953
Television in Metro Manila
ABS-CBN Corporation channels